The women's 400m Freestyle event at the 2006 Central American and Caribbean Games occurred on Friday, July 21, 2006 at the S.U. Pedro de Heredia Aquatic Complex in Cartagena, Colombia.

Records

Results

Final

Preliminaries

References

Results: 2006 CACs--Swimming: Women's 400 Freestyle--prelims from the official website of the 2006 Central American and Caribbean Games; retrieved 2009-07-05.
Results: 2006 CACs--Swimming: Women's 400 Freestyle--finals from the official website of the 2006 Central American and Caribbean Games; retrieved 2009-07-05.

Freestyle, Women's 400m
2006 in women's swimming